Swiss Global Air Lines operations were fully integrated into the route network of its parent company. This is a list of destinations served by Swiss Global Air Lines on behalf of Swiss International Air Lines as of August 2015. Swiss Global Air Lines was dissolved and merged into its parent by 19 April 2018.

Destinations

Africa 
Algeria
 Algiers - Houari Boumediene Airport

Asia 
China
 Shanghai - Shanghai Pudong International Airport
Hong Kong
 Hong Kong - Hong Kong International Airport
Israel
 Tel Aviv - Ben Gurion Airport
Singapore
 Singapore - Singapore Changi Airport
Thailand
 Bangkok - Suvarnabhumi Airport

Europe 
Belgium
 Brussels - Brussels Airport
Bosnia
 Sarajevo - Sarajevo International Airport
Bulgaria
 Sofia - Sofia Airport
Croatia
 Pula - Pula Airport
 Zagreb - Zagreb Airport
Czech Republic
 Prague - Václav Havel Airport Prague
France
 Lyon - Lyon-Saint Exupéry Airport
 Nice - Nice Côte d'Azur Airport
 Paris - Charles de Gaulle Airport
 Toulouse - Toulouse-Blagnac Airport
Germany
 Dresden - Dresden Airport
 Düsseldorf - Düsseldorf Airport
 Frankfurt - Frankfurt Airport
 Hannover -  Hannover Airport
 Leipzig/Halle - Leipzig/Halle Airport 
 Munich - Munich Airport
 Stuttgart - Stuttgart Airport
Italy
 Bari - Bari Karol Wojtyła Airport (Seasonal)
 Florence - Florence Airport
 Lamezia Terme - Lamezia Terme International Airport (Seasonal)
 Milan - Milan–Malpensa Airport
 Naples - Naples International Airport
 Rome - Leonardo da Vinci-Fiumicino Airport
 Venice - Venice Marco Polo Airport
Luxembourg
 Luxembourg City - Luxembourg Findel Airport
Netherlands
 Amsterdam - Amsterdam Airport Schiphol
Poland
 Kraków - John Paul II International Airport Kraków–Balice
Slovenia
 Ljubljana - Ljubljana Jože Pučnik Airport
Spain
 Bilbao - Bilbao Airport
Sweden
 Gothenburg - Göteborg Landvetter Airport
Switzerland
 Geneva - Geneva Airport
 Zürich - Zürich Airport (Hub)
United Kingdom
 Birmingham - Birmingham Airport
 London - London City Airport
 Manchester - Manchester Airport

Americas 
Canada
 Montréal - Montréal-Pierre Elliott Trudeau International Airport
United States
 Los Angeles -  Los Angeles International Airport
 Miami - Miami International Airport
 San Francisco - San Francisco International Airport

References

Lists of airline destinations